The surname Feng is a romanization of several Chinese surnames.

Féng 馮 / 冯

(wikt:馮 féng 2nd tone "gallop"), very common Chinese surname

Fèng 鳳 / 凤

(wikt:鳳 fèng 4th tone "phoenix"), relatively common Chinese family name

Fēng 風 / 风

(wikt:風 fēng 1st tone "wind"), rare Chinese surname

Fèng 奉

Fèng (wikt:奉 4th tone "offering") is a rare Chinese surname. In Cantonese Fung, in Middle Chinese Bong. origin of;
in Shaanxi the Qin (state), the Citizen of Yíng (嬴) get surname Fèng (奉) 
in Shandong the Qi (state), Jiang (姜) family get surname Fèng (奉)
in Zhejiang the Yue (state), Yue people (越族) get surname Fèng (奉)

Fēng 封

Fēng (wikt:封 1st tone) is a Chinese family name. It is No.208 in the Baijiaxing, and 257 in the modern census, called the "New Baijiaxing".

There are two recorded origins for the name. The first according to the Xingyuan (《姓苑》) from a prince originally with the name Jiang. The second according to Weishu Guanshizhi 《魏书·官氏志》 the name Fu (复) was changed to Feng (封).

Notable people with the surname Fēng (封)
Feng Deyi (封德彝) (568–627), formal name Feng Lun (封倫) chancellor to the emperors of the Tang Dynasty
Feng Changqing (Chinese: 封常清; pinyin: Fēng Chángqīng; Wade–Giles: Feng Ch'angch'ing (died January 24, 756) a general of the Tang Dynasty.

References

Feng
Chinese-language surnames
Multiple Chinese surnames